Borchotto is a town in central Ethiopia.

Transport
It is served indirectly by a station on the national railway system.

See also
Railway stations in Ethiopia

References

Populated places in the Oromia Region